The Shropshire Music Foundation is now known as Peace through Music International.  It is a not-for-profit organization which aims to improve the lives of children in war-torn countries through participation in Music.  Their mission is to "redress psychosocial trauma, advance emotional health, develop scholastic achievement, foster ethnic tolerance, promote peace, and improve the quality of life for war-affected children and adolescents through the establishment of on-going music education and performance programs."

Founded by Liz Shropshire, a music teacher in Los Angeles, U.S.A. in 1999, the Shropshire Foundation currently has programs around the world.  The Kosovo branch is helping children recover from the trauma of the ethnic cleansing that Serbian forces undertook in 1998. The SMF is helping children in Northern Ireland, where segregation of Protestants and Catholics has torn apart communities.  In Uganda, the SMF is helping children who have been victims of child soldiery. In Greece, SMF has been teaching music classes in refugee camps since Fall 2016.

Peace through Music International has an all-volunteer staff, and in many communities, the program is run by young adults who were so greatly influenced by Ms. Shropshire's foundation that they have committed to furthering the program.  Groups have sprung up all over the world to benefit the Shropshire Music Foundation (which is run entirely off donations).  Private contributors, music companies, and schools of music, such as the Eastman School of Music, are working to keep the foundation alive, as it has become financially threatened in recent years.

References

"Musicians for Peace" Benefit Album available on playitforward.com from 18 August 2017.

Children's arts organizations
Organizations established in 1999
Organizations for children affected by war
1999 establishments in England